In geometry, a monostatic polytope (or unistable polyhedron) is a d-polytope which "can stand on only one face". They were described in 1969 by J.H. Conway, M. Goldberg, R.K. Guy and K.C. Knowlton. The monostatic polytope in 3-space constructed independently by Guy and Knowlton has 19 faces. In 2012, Andras Bezdek discovered an 18 face solution, and in 2014, Alex Reshetov published a 14 face object.

Definition  
A polytope is called monostatic if, when filled homogeneously, it is stable on only one facet. Alternatively, a polytope is monostatic if its centroid (the center of mass) has an orthogonal projection in the interior of only one facet.

Properties 
 No convex polygon in the plane is monostatic.  This was shown by V. Arnold via reduction to the four-vertex theorem.  
 There are no monostatic simplices in dimension up to 8.  In dimension 3 this is due to Conway. In dimension up to 6 this is due to R.J.M. Dawson.  Dimensions 7 and 8 were ruled out by R.J.M. Dawson,  W. Finbow, and P. Mak.
 (R.J.M. Dawson) There exist monostatic simplices in dimension 10 and up.
 (Lángi) There are monostatic polytopes in dimension 3 whose shapes are arbitrarily close to a sphere.
 (Lángi) There are monostatic polytopes in dimension 3 with k-fold rotational symmetry for an arbitrary positive integer k.

See also 
 Gömböc
 Roly-poly toy

References  

 J.H. Conway, M. Goldberg and R.K. Guy, Problem 66-12, SIAM Review 11 (1969), 78–82.
 K.C. Knowlton, A unistable polyhedron with only 19 faces, Bell Telephone Laboratories MM 69-1371-3 (Jan. 3, 1969).
 H. Croft, K. Falconer, and R.K. Guy, Problem B12 in Unsolved Problems in Geometry, New York: Springer-Verlag, p. 61, 1991.
 R.J.M. Dawson, Monostatic simplexes.  Amer. Math. Monthly  92  (1985),  no. 8, 541–546. 
 R.J.M. Dawson, W. Finbow, P. Mak, Monostatic simplexes. II. Geom. Dedicata 70 (1998), 209–219. 
 R.J.M. Dawson, W. Finbow, Monostatic simplexes. III.  Geom. Dedicata  84 (2001), 101–113.
 Z. Lángi, A solution to some problems of Conway and Guy on monostable polyhedra, Bull. Lond. Math. Soc. 54 (2022), no. 2, 501–516.
 Igor Pak, Lectures on Discrete and Polyhedral Geometry, Section 9.
 A. Reshetov, A unistable polyhedron with 14 faces. Int. J. Comput. Geom. Appl.  24 (2014), 39–60.

External links
 
 YouTube: The uni-stable polyhedron
  Wolfram Demonstrations Project: Bezdek's Unistable Polyhedron With 18 Faces

Polyhedra